George E. Eskridge (born January 1, 1943) was a Republican Idaho State Representative from 2001 to 2014 representing District 1 in the B seat.

Early life, education, and career 
Eskridge graduated from Sandpoint High School, served four years as a sailor in the United States Navy, and then earned his bachelor's degree in business administration from the University of Montana.

Idaho House of Representatives

Committee assignments

Elections

References

External links
George E. Eskridge at the Idaho Legislature
 

1943 births
Living people
Republican Party members of the Idaho House of Representatives
People from Bonner County, Idaho
People from Bonners Ferry, Idaho
University of Montana alumni
United States Navy sailors
21st-century American politicians